The Office of the Special Representative of the Secretary-General on Sexual Violence in Conflict (OSRSG-SVC) is an office of the United Nations Secretariat tasked with serving the United Nations' spokesperson and political advocate on conflict-related sexual violence, the Special Representative of the Secretary-General on Sexual Violence in Conflict (SRSG-SVC). The Special Representative holds the rank of Under-Secretary-General of the United Nations and chairs the UN Action Against Sexual Violence in Conflict. The mandate of the SRSG-SVC was established by Security Council Resolution 1888, introduced by Hillary Clinton, and the first Special Representative, Margot Wallström, took office in 2010. The current Special Representative is Pramila Patten of Mauritius, who was appointed by United Nations Secretary General António Guterres in April 2017. The work of the SRSG-SVC is supported by the United Nations Team of Experts on the Rule of Law/Sexual Violence in Conflict, co-led by the Department of Peacekeeping Operations (DPO), Office of the High Commissioner for Human Rights (OHCHR) and the United Nations Development Programme (UNDP), also established under Security Council Resolution 1888.

History and role

The mandate was established in 2009 by United Nations Security Council Resolution 1888, one in a series of resolutions which recognized the detrimental impact that sexual violence in conflict has on communities, and acknowledged that the crime undermines peace and security efforts. The resolution signaled a change in the way the international community views and responds to conflict-related sexual violence. It is no longer seen as an inevitable by-product of war, but rather a, a crime that is preventable and punishable under international human rights law.

In April 2010, the first Special Representative, Margot Wallström of Sweden took office and in September 2012 Zainab Hawa Bagura of Sierra Leone took over and served until early 2017. Progress achieved by the Office so far includes:

 Greater visibility, political will and momentum than ever before;
 Development of a robust legislative framework in the Security Council, which has given the Office new tools to drive the mandate to the ground and begin to effect some changes in behaviour;
 More strategic and structured engagement with the security and justice sectors, as part of a prevention strategy;
 Beginning to see some accountability at international and national levels, as a vital aspect of deterrence and prevention;
 Beginning to see national ownership, leadership and responsibility, evident in formal commitments that many governments are making to deal with this problem in their countries as well as commitments by regional organizations.

The three priorities of current SRSG Pramila Patten are:

 Converting cultures of impunity into cultures of prevention and deterrence through justice and accountability
 Addressing structural gender-based inequality as the root cause and invisible driver of sexual violence in times of war and peace
 Fostering national ownership and leadership for a sustainable and holistic survivor-centered response.

According to the 2017 Report of the Secretary-General on Conflict-Related Sexual Violence, the Office focuses on 19 country situations, including 13 conflict settings, four post-conflict countries and two additional situations of concern.

Team of Experts 
The Office's Team of Experts (TOE) on the Rule of Law and Sexual Violence in Conflict works to strengthen the capacity of national rule of law and justice actors to investigate and prosecute for acts of conflict-related sexual violence. The lack of adequate national capacity to deliver justice often leads to widespread impunity and threatens survivors' access to justice, security and safety. The Team of Experts has been operational since 2011 and is the sole Security Council-mandated body tasked with building national capacity to enhance accountability for conflict-related sexual violence. It includes experts from the Department of Peacekeeping Operations (DPO), the Office of the High Commissioner for Human Rights (OHCHR) and the United Nations Development Programme (UNDP), which serve as co-lead entities. In addition, the Team is complemented by a law enforcement expert seconded by the Government of Sweden and a reparations expert. Pursuant to Security Council Resolution 1888 (2009), the Team focuses on: (i) working closely with national legal and judicial officials and other personnel in the relevant governments' civilian and military justice systems to address impunity, including by strengthening national capacity and drawing attention to the full range of justice mechanisms to be considered; (ii) identifying gaps in national response and encouraging a holistic national approach in addressing conflict-related sexual violence, including by enhancing criminal accountability, judicial capacity and responsiveness to victims (such as reparations mechanisms); (iii) making recommendations to coordinate domestic and international efforts and resources to reinforce governments' ability to address conflict-related sexual violence; and (iv) working with other UN mechanisms including UN Missions, Country Teams, and the SRSG-SVC towards the full implementation of resolutions 1820 (2008), 1888 (2009), 1960 (2010), 2106 (2013) and 2331 (2016). In line with its mandate, the Team of Experts provides assistance to governments, including in the areas of criminal investigation and prosecution; military justice; legislative reform; protection of victims and witnesses; reparations for survivors; and security sector oversight. In support of the Office of the SRSG-SVC, the TOE also serves a catalytic role in implementing joint communiqués and frameworks of cooperation agreed between the SRSG-SVC and national authorities, regional actors and other UN entities, complementing the work of UN country presences.

UN Action Against Sexual Violence in Conflict (UN Action) 
UN Action is a cross-UN initiative that unites the work of 24 entities with the goal of ending conflict-related sexual violence. The Chair of UN Action is the Special Representative on Sexual Violence in Conflict, Ms. Pramila Patten. Endorsed by the Secretary-General's Policy Committee in June 2007, it represents a concerted effort by the UN to work as one by amplifying advocacy, improving coordination and accountability and supporting country efforts to prevent conflict-related sexual violence and respond effectively to the needs of survivors. The UN Action Secretariat is based in the OSRSG-SVC and focuses on three main pillars:

Country-level Action: Strategic support to integrated UN Missions to help them design comprehensive strategies to combat conflict-related sexual violence and targeted support to strengthen joint UN programming.

Advocacy for Action: Raising public awareness and generating political will to address conflict-related sexual violence as part of a broader campaigns to Stop Rape Now and Unite to End Violence Against Women.

Learning by Doing: Creating a knowledge hub on the scale of conflict-related sexual violence and effective responses by the UN and partners.

The 24 entities in the network are: Department of Peacekeeping Operations (DPO), International Labour Organization (ILO), International Organization for Migration (IOM), International Trade Centre (ITC), Joint United Nations Program of HIV/AIDS (UNAIDS), Office for the Coordination of Humanitarian Affairs (OCHA), Office of the High Commissioner for Human Rights (OHCHR), Office of the Special Representative of the Secretary-General for Children and Armed Conflict (OSRSG/CAAC), Office of the Special Representative of the Secretary-General on Violence against Children (OSRSG-VAC), United Nations Department of Global Communications (UNDGC), United Nations Entity for Gender Equality and the Empowerment of Women (UN Women), United Nations Environment Programme (UNEP) , United Nations Children's Fund (UNICEF), United Nations Counter-Terrorism Committee Executive Directorate (CTED), United Nations Department of Political Affairs (DPA), United Nations Development Programme (UNDP), United Nations High Commissioner for Refugees (UNHCR), United Nations Office for Disarmament Affairs (UNODA), United Nations Office on Drugs and Crime (UNODC), United Nations Office on Genocide Prevention (OSAPG), United Nations Peacebuilding Support Office (UN-PBSO), United Nations Population Fund(UNFPA), World Food Programme (WFP), World Health Organization (WHO).

Secretary-General's Report on Conflict-Related Sexual Violence 
The Office publishes the Report of the Secretary-General on Conflict-Related Sexual Violence annually to highlight a number of new and emerging concerns in relation to the use of sexual violence by parties to armed conflict as a tactic of war and terrorism. The report contains an annex of a list of parties credibly suspected of committing or being responsible for patterns of rape or other forms of sexual violence in situations of armed conflict, the majority of whom are non-state actors. It tracks developments relevant to the implementation of Resolutions 1820 (2008), 1888 (2009) and 1960 (2010) in 18 conflict-affected and post-conflict states and it is compiled through the analysis of data provided by United Nations offices, civil society and regional organizations, as well as Member States. The 2017 Report covers the following countries: Afghanistan, Bosnia and Herzegovina, Burundi, Central African Republic, Colombia, the Democratic Republic of the Congo (DRC), Iraq, Libya, Mali, Myanmar, Nepal, Nigeria, Somalia, South Sudan, Sri Lanka, Sudan (Darfur), Syrian Arab Republic and Yemen.

List of Special Representatives on Sexual Violence in Conflict

References

External links
Official website

United Nations Secretariat
Sexual violence